Juybadam (also Romanized as Jūybādām; also known as Jow Bādām, Jow-ye Bādām, Jūbādām, and Jūb Bādām) is a village in Javaran Rural District, Hanza District, Rabor County, Kerman Province, Iran. At the 2006 census, its population was 63, in 18 families.

References 

Populated places in Rabor County